Akademiya was a Russian association football club from Tolyatti, Russia. The club was founded in 1991 as a result of the merger between Energiya and Lada-Simbirsk. Before the 2010 season, two teams from Tolyatti, FC Togliatti and FC Lada Togliatti, were excluded from the professional leagues, with FC Akademiya representing Tolyatti at the time.

Former names 

 Lada Dimitrovgrad (1991 – June 1997)
 Lada-Grad Dimitrovgrad (June 1997 – 1998)
 Lada-Simbirsk Dimitrovgrad (1999)
 Lada-Energiya Dimitrovgrad (2000 – 2002)
 Lada-SOK Dimitrovgrad (2003 – 2005)
 Krylia Sovetov-SOK Dimitrovgrad (2006–2007)
 Akademiya Dimitrovgrad (2008–2009)
 Akademiya Tolyatti (2009–2013)
 Akademiya-Lada-M (2015–2018)
 Akademiya (2018–)

In early 2008, most of the players and coaches from the 2007 Krylya Sovetov-SOK roster moved to a new club, FC Togliatti. That club formally was from Tolyatti, but played in Dimitrovgrad on the same field as FC Akademiya.

See also 

 Konoplyov football academy
 FC Akron Tolyatti
 FC Krylia Sovetov Samara
 FC Lada Togliatti
 FC Togliatti

References

External links 

 Official website 
 Statistics at klisf.info 

Defunct football clubs in Russia
Association football clubs established in 1991
Association football clubs disestablished in 2013
Sport in Ulyanovsk Oblast
Sport in Tolyatti
1991 establishments in Russia
2013 disestablishments in Russia